Elachista ilicrina is a moth in the family Elachistidae. It was described by Mark I. Falkovitsh in 1986. It is found in Uzbekistan.

The wingspan is about 9 mm. The forewings are pure white and the hindwings are nearly white. Its head is unicolorous creamy white.

References

Moths described in 1986
ilicrina
Moths of Asia